Hoya shepherdii is a species of flowering plant in the genus Hoya native to the eastern Himalayas and Assam. It is known for its long, slender foliage that superficially resembles a green bean, somewhat similar to Hoya kentiana and Hoya wayetii.

References

shepherdii
Plants described in 1861